Durga is a 1974 Indian Malayalam film, directed and produced by Kunchacko. The film stars Prem Nazir, Adoor Bhasi, Manavalan Joseph and Boban Kunchacko in the lead roles. The film had musical score by G. Devarajan.

Cast

Prem Nazir as Professor Damadharan, Ramu (double role)
Adoor Bhasi as Johny
Manavalan Joseph as Aali
Boban Kunchacko as Mukunthan
Adoor Pankajam as Yashoda
G. K. Pillai as Swami
Rajasree as Latha
K. P. Ummer as Kunjikannan
N. Govindankutty as Kattumalayan
Rajakokila as Kanthi
S. P. Pillai as Ambu
Sumithra as Vasanthy
Ushakumari as Radha
Vijayanirmala as Thulasi
Vincent as Mohan
Kaduvakulam Antony as Mammad

Soundtrack
The music was composed by G. Devarajan and the lyrics were written by Vayalar Ramavarma.

References

External links

SEE THE FILM
 DURGA MALAYALAM MOVIE

1974 films
1970s Malayalam-language films